A bungee trampoline (also known as a bungy trampoline or just trampoline) is an attraction at many fairs, vacation resorts and several summer camps. There are many different designs of bungee trampolines, but most operate in the same fashion. The participant puts on a bungee trampoline  harness  and is then hooked to several bungee ropes. Those ropes are attached to poles or bars reaching an average of fifteen feet above the trampoline platform. As the participant jumps higher and higher the bungee ropes are moved up the poles allowing the participant to reach heights and do flips and other maneuvers that would otherwise be impossible on a regular trampoline.

A bungee trampoline is a mechanical amusement attraction which contains a support structure of 3 to 8 m in height or 10 to 26 feet, a pulley system to anchor and retract bungee cords, a trampoline the jumper will bounce on, a harness to attach the jumper to the cords and structure, and a winch—either electric or manual—to put tension on the bungee cords by pulling on them through the pulleys.

Bungee trampolines are used at fairs, malls, summer-winter camps, at the beach, and for amusement and birthday party rentals. Some cruise ships have bungee trampolines on board. Even mountain resorts (including ski resorts that use other attractions in the "summer season") started using them as attractions. There are different models that range in ease of use and also in ease of setup. Some are on trailers and have single trampoline mats, some are doubles, and then there are the four, five and six versions.

All bungee Trampolines operate under the same principle. The participant puts on a bungee trampoline harness according to their waist size, and depending on the person's weight they hooked to the relative number of bungee ropes. Those ropes connect to a climbing rope which goes through a pulley system connected to the highest point on the jump structure and after connecting to an electric winch or manual winch. As the participant gains momentum, the operator puts more tension on the bungee ropes by using the hand controller to re-coil the winch and retract the rope, allowing the participant to reach heights as high as the structure or higher and do flips and other maneuvers that would otherwise be impossible on a regular trampoline for untrained people. There are hydraulic models along with winch models depending on the age and manufacturer of the unit.

Recently bungee trampolines have also been combined with spider towers, zip-lines, rock climbing walls, and other amusement equipment, to offer more entertainment options. This include EuroBungy, in which the trampoline is not needed. Despite that however, they are still often added for extra height.

References

Amusement rides